In the context of the enlargement of NATO, Article 10 of the North Atlantic Treaty is the origin for the April 1999 statement of a "NATO open door policy".

History

Following the Eastern European Revolutions in the autumn of 1989, countries from the former Eastern bloc became interested in joining NATO, in case of something would happen to them again in the future. During a March 1992 visit to Warsaw, NATO Secretary General Manfred Wörner said that the "doors to NATO are open". During the December 1994 OSSE conference in Budapest, the United States and its NATO allies had insisted that no European countries should be prevented from joining the alliance.

On 12 March 1999, Poland, Hungary and the Czech Republic joined NATO as the first former Eastern Bloc states, beginning the expansion of NATO eastwards. When NATO was expanded further with Estonia, Latvia, Lithuania, Bulgaria, Romania, Slovakia and Slovenia on 29 March 2004, President George W. Bush of the USA prepared for even further expansion of the alliance. During the welcoming ceremony held the same day, he said:

The April 2008 Bucharest Summit communiqué re-affirmed the NATO allies' "commitment to keeping NATO's door open to any European democracy willing and able to assume the responsibilities and obligations of membership, in accordance with Article 10 of the Washington Treaty." At that summit, Ukraine was invited to join the Alliance.

In a 2 December 2015 "Statement by NATO Foreign Ministers on Open Door Policy" Montenegro was invited to join the alliance, and the signatories encouraged "Georgia to continue making full use of all the opportunities for coming closer to the Alliance." They remained "committed to the Open Door Policy, a founding principle of the Washington Treaty" and encouraged "partners to continue to implement the necessary reforms and decisions to prepare for membership," while they "will continue to offer political and practical support to the efforts" of the partners.

At the end of November 2020, it became known that the NATO Summit in 2021 will consider a return to the "NATO open door policy", including the issue of providing Georgia with a Membership Action Plan (MAP).

On 9 February 2021, the Prime Minister of Ukraine, Denys Shmyhal, stated that he hoped that Ukraine would be able to receive an action plan for NATO membership at the same time as Georgia. In response, the NATO Secretary-General confirmed during Shmyhal's visit to Brussels that Ukraine is a candidate for NATO membership.

On 14 June 2021, a communiqué issued at 2021 Brussels summit reaffirmed commitment to the Open Door Policy, as well as "all elements" of the decision made at the 2008 Bucharest Summit that Georgia and Ukraine will become members of NATO.

On 7 January 2022, ahead of a bilateral meeting with Russia, NATO Secretary-General Jens Stoltenberg said that "Russia's unprovoked and unjustified military buildup in and around Ukraine” has serious implications for European security and stability and that Russian forces are only strengthening a noose around Ukraine. A Ukrainian official said at the time that “There should not be any compromise with Russia... They recognize only force. Weakness will provoke them... NATO must show that doors are open and promises kept.” Stoltenberg said that “The Russian military buildup has not stopped. It continues and [is] gradually building up with more forces, more capabilities,” whereupon he described armored units, artillery, combat-ready troops, electronic warfare equipment, and other military capabilities. Stoltenberg was clear that the alliance would not heed Russia's demand to withdraw the invitation for Ukraine and Georgia to join NATO—or for any country to pursue the path of its choosing.

On 28 January 2022, an op-ed was published by the New York University School of Law in which the author disclosed that in two drafts of a 2021 NATO-Russia treaty, "Moscow placed the onus of averting an expanded conflict in Ukraine on the West broadly, NATO particularly, and the United States specifically. Among other stipulations, Moscow insisted that NATO's open door to new members be shut."

In the wake of the 24 February 2022 Russian invasion of Ukraine, the 30 NATO Heads of State held a meeting on 24 March in Brussels and one result was a statement, which read in part:

In May 2022, Turkey announced that while fully supporting NATO's open door policy, it opposes the memberships of Finland and Sweden for allegedly supporting terrorism.

References

 
Enlargement of intergovernmental organizations
Events affected by the 2022 Russian invasion of Ukraine
NATO